Heterotermes indicola, is a species of subterranean termite of the genus Heterotermes. It causes damage to timber in buildings and is one of the most destructive termites in urban and agricultural areas in the world. Soldiers are about 4.1-4.9mm long. Extracts of garlic and Calotropis procera are known to have termiticidal effects on H. indicola.

Ecology
Subterranean termites live in colonies underground, with no mounds or above-ground structures to indicate that they are present. Sugarcane can be severely attacked causing 90 to 100% damage, fruit orchards 80 to 90% damage, maize 45% damage and wheat 10 to 12% damage. Another crop attacked by this termite is the bitter melon (Momordica charantia).  This termite favours a soil moisture content of 20 to 30%, and a timber moisture content of 80 to 100%.

These termites are known to attack and feed on many economically important species on a large scale, reducing their yield. Trees and woody plants attacked include:

Abies pindrow
Acacia arabica
Albizzia lebbeck 
Alstonia scholaris 
Azadirachta indica
Betula utilis
Camellia sinensis
Cedrus deodara
Cordia oblique
Dalbergia sissoo
Ehretia serrate
Erythrina suberosa
Eucalyptus citriodora
Ficus religiosa
Heterophragma adenophyllum
Mangifera indica
Melia azedarach
Momordica charantia
Moringa oleifera
Morus spp.
Pinus wallichiana
Pinus roxberghii 
Populus deltoides 
Putranjiva roxburghii
Syzygium cumini
Terminalia arjuna
Ziziphus jujuba

Structural damage
This subterranean termite causes extensive damage in houses to wooden structures, as well as feeding on paper, cloth and other cellulose-containing products. It gains entry to buildings through timber in contact with the ground, creating galleries along the grain of the wood. It hollows out the timber, leaving a thin external layer intact and plastering the interior surfaces with excreta. It also creates mud tunnels along surfaces, and sometimes creates hanging, stub tunnels, a particular characteristic of this species. Timber buildings can be badly affected by this termite, and in the 1940s, the small town of Sri Hargobindpur in Punjab had to be abandoned because of the destruction wreaked by this species.

References

External links
Semiochemicals of Heterotermes indicola
Insecticidal studies on Heterotermis indicola Wasmann (Isoptera: Heterotermitidae) under laboratory conditions
Toxicity and repellency of different insecticides against Heterotermes indicola (Isoptera: Rhinotermitidae)
Toxicity and Retention of Dye Markers to Heterotermes indicola
Evaluation of chlorfluazuron against subterranean termites Heterotermes indicola (Isoptera: Rhinotermitidae) in Pakistan
Efficacy of indoxacarb and chlorfenapyr against subterranean termite Heterotermes indicola (Wasmann) (Isoptera: Rhinotermitidae) in the laboratory
First record of Heterotermes indicola (Isoptera: Rhinotermitidae) from south India
Potential of Fipronil as a Feeding Toxicant Against the Subterranean Termite Heterotermes indicola (Rhinotermitidae: Isoptera)
A termite trap, NIFA Termap for capturing large number of field population of Heterotermes indicola
Occurrence of enzymes for protein digestion in the termite Heterotermes indicola
Preliminary Evaluation of Ocimum Sanctum As Toxicant and Repellent Against Termite, Heterotermes indicola (Wasmann) (Isoptera: Rhinotermitidae)
Aberrant Behavior of Heterotermes indicola (Wasmann) in Constructing Hanging Food Tunnels
The Effect of some Protozoacides, on the Survival of Symbiotic Flagellates of Coptotermes heimi and Heterotermes indicola.

Rhinotermitidae
Insects described in 1911
Invertebrates of Pakistan